Patsy (born Patricia Pepping Valles on 1963 in Mexico City, Mexico) is a Mexican actress and singer.

Biography 
Patsy was born on 1963 in Mexico City, she had American descent. 7 years old moved with her family in United States. In 1983 she had debut in television. Has many roles in telenovelas Bodas de odio, El Camino Secreto, Pobre señorita Limantour, Mi Destino Eres Tú, Amar sin límites, Mar de amor, Amores verdaderos and Lo imperdonable.

In 1988, she released an LP titled "Patsy", which was not very successful. Two years later, he released the LP titled "Amor de medianoche". In 2004, Patsy returned to music with a third album also called "Patsy", being his latest record material to date.

She had three children: Kristel, Alexandra and Allan.

Filmography

Discografphy
1988 – "Patsy»
1990 – "Amor de medianoche»
2004 –	"Patsy»

References

External links 

1963 births
Living people
Mexican telenovela actresses
Mexican television actresses
Mexican film actresses
Mexican women singers
Actresses from Mexico City
Singers from Mexico City
20th-century Mexican actresses
21st-century Mexican actresses
Mexican people of American descent
People from Mexico City